Josef Swickard (26 June 1866 – 1 March 1940) was a Prussian-born veteran stage and screen character actor, who had toured with stock companies in Europe, South Africa, and South America.

Career

Swickard emigrated to the United States from Germany in 1882. He was a stage actor several years before entering films with D.W. Griffith in 1912 and by 1914 was playing supporting roles for Mack Sennett. He appeared in Charles Chaplin's Laughing Gas and Caught in a Cabaret.  He remained with Sennett until 1917, when he settled into his prolific career of playing mostly aristocratic characters.

Modern audiences are perhaps most familiar with his role of Marcelo Desnoyers, the well-intentioned but impractical French upper class father in Rex Ingram's 1921 film The Four Horsemen of the Apocalypse. His career in sound films was somewhat limited and he played in low-budget and action serial type films.  He played the villainous Prime Minister Kruel in the 1925 film version of The Wizard of Oz.

Family Life & Death

Born in the Kingdom of Prussia in 1866 to Peter Schwecherath and Geniveve Steffens, Swickard was the brother of actor Charles Swickard. After arriving in the United States in November 1882, Schwecherath changed his name to Swickard and married a Scottish woman named Queeny in 1896.  In 1902, Swickard applied for citizenship in the Eastern District of New York under the name Joseph P. Schwickerath. Records also show Swickard submitted a petition for naturalization in Los Angeles, California in February 1936 under the name of Peter Joseph Schwickerath. Sometime around 1928 Swickard married Broadway actress Margaret Campbell. That union was short-lived and the couple divorced on January 15, 1929. Swickard's last known residence was the Plaza Hotel in Los Angeles where he lived after his divorce from Campbell. Tragedy befell his ex-wife on June 27, 1939 when she was brutally murdered. Her son, Campbell McDonald, was the initial suspect. He was also suspected of having bludgeoned to death a Russian dancer, Anya Sosoyeva, as well as having assaulted the young actress Delia Bogard, who survived.LA police eventually arrested DeWitt Clinton Cook, who confessed and was sent to San Quentin, where he died in the gas chamber in 1941. Swickard died in 1940 from natural causes. He was falsely rumored to have jumped from the Hollywood sign.

The Evening Independent June 29, 1939. [6]news|url=https://www.newspapers.com/clip/7141470/echo_of_murder_of_bahai_actress/|title=Margaret Campbell murdered|newspaper=The Daily Times-News |date=28 June 1939 |page=6 }}</ref> Nearly seven months to-the-day after his ex-wife's murder, Swickard died on February 29, 1940. He was 73.

Despite rumors that Swickard committed suicide by jumping from the Hollywood sign, his death was from natural causes. Swickard was buried under a simple headstone at Hollywood Forever Cemetery.

Filmography

See also

References

External links

1866 births
1940 deaths
American male silent film actors
American male film actors
Burials at Hollywood Forever Cemetery
German emigrants to the United States
20th-century American male actors